The New Beginning in Nagoya was a professional wrestling event promoted by New Japan Pro-Wrestling (NJPW). The event took place on January 30, 2021 in Nagoya, Aichi at the Aichi Prefectural Gymnasium (Dolphins Arena). This was the thirtieth event promoted under the NJPW The New Beginning name and the first to be held in Nagoya.

The event featured five matches on the card. The main event was Shingo Takagi defending the NEVER Openweight Championship against Hiroshi Tanahashi. Other matches included Hiroyoshi Tenzan of Tencozy taking on Great-O-Khan of United Empire and their teammates, Satoshi Kojima and Will Ospreay, also squared off in the semi-main event.

Production

Background 
Since 2020, NJPW are unable to run events with full capacity due to COVID-19 restrictions. The New Beginning is NJPW's first major show after their annual January 4 Tokyo Dome Show, which is their biggest show of the year.

Storylines 
The New Beginning in Nagoya featured five professional wrestling matches that involve different wrestlers from pre-existing scripted feuds and storylines. Wrestlers portray villains, heroes, or less distinguishable characters in the scripted events that build tension and culminate in a wrestling match or series of matches.

On night two of Wrestle Kingdom 15, Shingo Takagi successfully defended the NEVER Openweight Championship against Jeff Cobb. At New Year Dash!!, Takagi issued a challenge to Hiroshi Tanahashi for the championship, the match was scheduled for The New Beginning in Nagoya.

On night one of Wrestle Kingdom 15, both Great-O-Khan and Will Ospreay from the stable The Empire lost their matches. At New Year Dash!!, The Empire defeated Satoshi Kojima, Hiroyoshi Tenzan and Yota Tsuji in a match. Post-match; Ospreay, Great-O-Khan and Cobb attacked Kojima and Tenzan, Ospreay proclaims that The Empire will take over 2021 and the stable will now be called United Empire. Ospreay and Great-O-Khan was scheduled to face Kojima and Tenzan in single matches. During the Road to New Beginning on January 25, Ospreay challenged Kojima to a No Disqualification match which Kojima accepted. NJPW confirmed the No Disqualification stipulation for Ospreay vs. Kojima after the event, they also announced that the loser of Great-O-Khan vs. Tenzan must stop using the Mongolian chop.

Results

See also
 2021 in professional wrestling
 List of major NJPW events

References

External links 

2021 in professional wrestling
January 2021 events in Japan
Events in Nagoya
Professional wrestling in Japan